Synchiropus circularis, the circled dragonet, is a species of fish in the family Callionymidae, the dragonets. It is found in the Western Pacific.

Etymology
The fish is named after the body's circumferential white blotches.

References

Myers, R.F., 1991. Micronesian reef fishes. Second Ed. Coral Graphics, Barrigada, Guam. 298 p. 

circularis
Fish of the Pacific Ocean
Fish of East Asia
Taxa named by Ronald Fricke
Fish described in 1984